Alfred Alvarez may refer to:

 Al Alvarez (1929–2019), English poet, novelist, essayist and critic
 Alfred "Chico" Alvarez (1920–1992), Canadian jazz trumpeter
 Alfred Alvarez Newman (1851–1887), English metalworker and art collector